The  Canton of Friville-Escarbotin  is a canton situated in the department of the Somme and in the Hauts-de-France region of northern France.

Geography 
The canton is organised around the commune of Friville-Escarbotin in the arrondissement of Abbeville.

Composition
At the French canton reorganisation which came into effect in March 2015, the canton was expanded from 9 to 24 communes:

Allenay
Ault
Béthencourt-sur-Mer
Bourseville
Brutelles
Cayeux-sur-Mer
Fressenneville
Friaucourt
Friville-Escarbotin
Lanchères
Méneslies
Mers-les-Bains
Nibas
Ochancourt
Oust-Marest
Pendé
Saint-Blimont
Saint-Quentin-la-Motte-Croix-au-Bailly
Tully
Valines
Vaudricourt
Woignarue
Woincourt  
Yzengremer

Population

See also
 Arrondissements of the Somme department
 Cantons of the Somme department
 Communes of the Somme department

References

Friville-Escarbotin